The 1988 Miami Hurricanes football team represented the University of Miami during the 1988 NCAA Division I-A football season. It was the Hurricanes' 63rd season of football. The Hurricanes were led by fifth-year head coach Jimmy Johnson and played their home games at the Orange Bowl. They finished the season 11–1 overall. They were invited to the Orange Bowl where they defeated Nebraska, 23-3.

Schedule

Personnel

Roster

Coaching staff

Support staff

Rankings

Game summaries

Florida State

at Michigan

Wisconsin

Missouri

    
    
    
    
    
    
    
    
    

The dominating win over Missouri was Miami's most lopsided victory in 21 years, dating back to a 58-0 win over Pittsburgh in 1967.

at Notre Dame

Source:

Cincinnati

Steve Walsh 286 Yds, 5 TD (tied school record)

at East Carolina

Tulsa

at LSU

Arkansas

Source: Box Score

BYU

vs. Nebraska (Orange Bowl)

Awards and honors
Steve Walsh, Sammy Baugh Trophy

Jack Harding University of Miami MVP Award
Steve Walsh, QB

1989 NFL Draft

References

Miami
Miami Hurricanes football seasons
Orange Bowl champion seasons
Miami Hurricanes football